The 2000 COMESA Cup was the first and only edition of the COMESA Cup. Rwanda defeated Zimbabwe in the final to win the title. The tournament stood in place of the 2000 COSAFA Cup and was competition to the 2000 CECAFA Cup.

History
The tournament, which was sponsored by Coca Cola, was originally created by politicians from 22 member states of the Common Market for Eastern and Southern Africa (COMESA). The creation of the competition was seen as a threat to the existence of CECAFA which could potentially be replaced by COMESA's new interest in football. It was announced in July 2000 that the tournament would take place in Lusaka, Zambia where the COMESA headquarters are located.

Qualifying
Originally fourteen member associations from nations who were members of COMESA were expected to participate in a qualifying tournament from 27 August to 24 September 2000. In the end, the qualifiers were cancelled and only five teams competed in the single-elimination tournament.

Participants

Actual
 Eritrea
 Kenya B
 Rwanda
 Zambia
 Zimbabwe

Withdrew
 Sudan
 Burundi
 Namibia
 DR Congo
 Malawi
 Ethiopia
 Madagascar
 Swaziland
 Mauritius

Matches
The final tournament matches were originally scheduled to begin 10 October 2000 but were later pushed back to 28 October.

Quarter-final

Semi-finals

Third place match

Final

References

2000
Football competitions in Zambia
2000 in association football